The Quba Mosque is a mosque located on the outskirts of Medina, Saudi Arabia. Depending on whether the Mosque of the Companions in the Eritrean city of Massawa is older or not, it may be the first mosque in the world that dates to the lifetime of the Islamic prophet Muhammad in the 7th century CE. According to records, its first stones were positioned by Muhammad as soon as he arrived on his emigration from the city of Mecca to Medina, and the mosque was completed by his companions. Per Quranic texts, Muhammad spent 14 days in this mosque praying qaṣr (a short prayer) while waiting for Ali to arrive in Medina, after the latter stayed behind in Mecca to safeguard Muhammad’s life and safe escape by sleeping in Muhammad’s bed in his place. Also going along with traditional saying, this mosque is said to be where the first Friday prayer was held, led by Muhammad.

According to Islamic tradition, performing Wuḍūʾ ('Ablution') in one's home then offering two Rakaʿāt of Nafl (Optional) prayers in the Quba Mosque is equal to performing one ʿUmrah. Muhammad used to go there, riding or on foot, every Saturday and offer a two rakaʿāt-prayer. He advised others to do the same, saying, "Whoever makes ablutions at home and then goes and prays in the Mosque of Quba, he will have a reward like that of an 'Umrah." This ḥadīth was reported by Ahmad ibn Hanbal, Al-Nasa'i, Ibn Majah and Hakim al-Nishaburi. In keeping with traditional belief, this mosque is said to be the site of Muhammad's first Friday prayer.

Architecture
When the Driehaus Prize winner and New Classical architect Abdel-Wahed El-Wakil was commissioned, in the 20th century, to conceive a larger mosque, he intended to incorporate the old structure into his design. But the old mosque was torn down and replaced with a new one.

The new mosque consists of a rectangular prayer hall raised on a second story platform. The prayer hall connects to a cluster containing residential areas, offices, ablution facilities, shops and a library.

The recent new construction of the Quba Mosque that happened in 1984 include many new additions, such as 7 main entrances, 4 parallel minarets, and the 56 mini domes that surround the perimeter of the mosque from an overhead point of view. The courtyard of this mosque is composed of black, red, and white marble. And majority of the structure and interior structures such as the minbar and mihrab are all composed of white marble. Originally, there was one minaret, the new renovations included the addition of the other three minarets, they rest on square bases, have octagonal shafts which take on a circular shape as they reach the top.

Prayer Hall
The prayer hall is arranged around a central courtyard, characterised by six large domes resting on clustered columns. A portico, which is two bays in depth, borders the courtyard on the east and west, while a one-bayed portico borders it on the north, and separates it from the women's prayer area.

The women's prayer area, which is surrounded by a screen, is divided into two parts as a passageway connects the northern entrance with the courtyard.
When Quba Mosque was rebuilt in 1986, the Medina architecture was retained – ribbed white domes, and basalt facing and modest exterior – qualities that recalls Madina's simplicity. The courtyard, is flagged with black, red and white marble. It is screened overhead by day from the scorching heat with shades. Arabesque latticework filters the light of the palm groves outside.  Elements of the new building include work by the Egyptian architect Abdel-Wahed El-Wakil and the Stuttgart tensile architect Mahmoud Bodo Rasch, a student of Frei Otto.

Landmarks
-Masjid Dirar (previously)

The Quba Mosque is the oldest mosque and one of the first in Islam.

Mentions

In hadith
The merits of Masjid Quba are mentioned in nineteen Sahih al-Bukhari hadiths; thirteen Sahih Muslim hadiths; two Sunan Abu Dawood hadiths; six Al-Muwatta hadiths.

Muhammad  frequented the mosque and prayed there. This is referred to in a number of hadith:

In the Qur'an
It is believed to be the mosque which the Qur'an mentions as being founded on piety and devoutness (Masjid al-Taqwa)

Gallery

See also
 List of mosques in Saudi Arabia
 Lists of mosques
 Holiest sites in Islam
 Islamic architecture
 Islamic art
 Quba (city)
 Timeline of Muslim history

References

 Muhammad: The Messenger of Islam by Hajjah Amina Adil (p. 286)
 The Naqshbandi Sufi Tradition Guidebook of Daily Practices and Devotions by Hisham Kabbani (p. 301)
 Happold: The Confidence to Build by Derek Walker and Bill Addis (p. 81)

External links

 Virtues of Masjid Quba , Madina - Taken from Tafsir Ibn Kathir and other Saheeh Hadith

7th-century mosques
Mosques in Medina
New Classical architecture
Abdel-Wahed El-Wakil buildings
Mosques completed in 622